Ricardo Rizzo (born 29 August 2000) is an Australian  footballer who plays as a goalkeeper for Hills United .

References

External links

2000 births
Living people
Australian soccer players
Association football goalkeepers
Holbeach United F.C. players
C.A. Cerro players
Central Coast Mariners FC players
Uruguayan Primera División players